The Basadi in Music Awards (BIMAs) are South African music awards show in association with  South African Music Performance Rights Association (SAMPRA), created by Hloni Modise in 2022. The awards will celebrate and honour  women's in South African music industry.

Categories 

 Artist of the Year 
 Rap/Hip Hop Artist of the Year 
 Gospel Artist of the Year 
 Kwaito Artist of the Year 
 Amapiano Artist of the Year 
 Best Dance Artist of the Year 
 Afro Pop Artist of the Year 
 Jazz Artist of the Year 
 Newcomer of the Year 
 Best Entertainment Radio Presenter 
 Female DJ of the Year 
 Best Pop Artist of the Year 
 Kontemporêre Artist of the Year 
 Music TV Show Presenter of the Year 
 Entertainment Journalist of the Year 
 Social Media Influencer of the Year 
 Music Video Director of the Year 
 Songwriter of the Year 
 Stylist of the Year 
 Best Entertainment Radio Producer

List of ceremonies
The inaugural ceremony initially was scheduled to be  in August 2022. The ceremony date was rescheduled to October 15, 2022.

References

Awards established in 2022
African music awards